Acolon is a German wine grape variety, a cross between Blauer Lemberger (Blaufränkisch) and Dornfelder. 

It was created in 1971 at the Staatliche Lehr- und Versuchsanstalt für Wein- und Obstbau in Weinsberg (nr. Württemberg), Germany. The variety was officially recognised in 2002. It ripens early and produces a very color-intensive wine with mild tannins, resembling Lemberger. Currently it is growing experimentally on 1.35 square kilometres. Since 1981 it has often been used as a partner in creating new genetically diverse varieties.

References

External links
VIVC grape database

Red wine grape varieties